Agros is a village built on the Troödos Mountains, in the region of Pitsilia, in southwest Cyprus, which has built amphitheatrically among high mountains at an altitude of 1100 metres with a population of approximately 1,000. Agros is one of the most interesting villages of Cyprus and the Pitsilia area. The village is located 45 minutes away from the cities of Nicosia and Limassol, 20 minutes from Troodos Square and 80 minutes from the international airports of Larnaca and Paphos.

History

The village of Agros was named after the Monastery of Megalos Agros, which was built at the spot where the Church of Panayia of Agros is found today. According to tradition 40 monks from Cyzicus of Asia Minor, during the era of Byzantine Iconoclasm abandoned the Monastery of Megalos Agros and arrived in Cyprus carrying the icon of the Holy Mother. They ended up at the area where Agros is located today, stayed for a certain period in a cave. They built a new monastery naming it Monastery of Megalos Agros after the name of monastery they left in Minor Asia. The survivors left their houses and moved close to the monastery. So a new village was formed with the name of Agros. Finally in 1894 the monastery was ruined leaving the village a great historical inheritance.

National contribution

The village of Agros was always present to all national fights. The patriotism and strength of the people of Agros were recorded on the pages of the Greek and Cypriot history. Following there is a report on the contribution of the people of Agros to the national fights based on a relevant chapter of the book “Agros, I Eptalofi tis Pitsilias”*.

Greek Revolution 1821
After the tragic events of the 9th of July 1821, the Exarch of the Metropolis of Kiti sought shelter in Agros. In particular, he undertook the managing of the property of the Monastery of Agros. Later on, however, the exarch decides to seek shelter in the Monastery of Kykkos, but the Turks search for him at the Monastery of Agros. When the latter find the Monastery closed, they take it out on the tax collector of Agros, Constantinos Kemitzis, who chose not to testify of having known about the exarch. The Turks, according to Hadjipetris, “crumpled the tax collector in a large chair and threw him down a very deep and steep cliff where he was tragically killed”.  What was particularly sad is the fact that when the exarch returned to the village, not only did he behave like a tyrant, but he would also embezzle the Monastery's incomes.

Greco-Turkish War(1897)
According to the research of Petros Papapolyviou which is cited in the book of Hadjipetris, three men from Agros were volunteers in the Greek-Turkish war.

Balkan Wars
Unfortunately, our evidence is insufficient regarding the participation of the people of Agros in the Balkan Wars. However, we do know that some people from Agros participated in the Balkan wars and then in World War I. Additionally, the people of Agros also contributed to the wars financially. In particular, according to the data of Papapolyviou's research, the contribution of Agros was 7 pounds and 13 cents.

World War I
As we have already mentioned, the people of Agros who participated in World War I were the same fourteen who had fought in the Balkan wars. However, it is believed that there had been more people from Agros who took part, possibly expatriates who lived in Nicosia, Lemesos or even abroad. Most of them served in the Health Services or as mule drivers.

The people of Agros who participated in the Balkan wars, as well as in World War II were:

Philippos Gregorides
Petros Kitromilides
Augoustis Savvas Lefteris
Kyriakos Konstanti Kalimeras
Savvas Avloitos
Aristodemos Constantinou
Cleanthis Mappourides
Sophronis Grousos
Cleanthis Savva (Machos)
Sophocles Michaelides (Kenevezos)
Savvas Hadjisavvas
Loukaides Kyriacos (mechanic)
Sophocles Koufides (sanitary)
Neoclis Shipillis

Union referendums of 1921 and 1930
On March 25, 1921, the priests, teachers, Land Committee and School Committee signed the Unification Referendum because, in the meantime, they had become public servants. The main demand of the referendums was the Unification of Cyprus with Greece.

Octovriana (The uprising of October 1931)
The imposition of custom duties by the British government, in combination with its denial to satisfy the motion for unification and the difficult financial conditions of that period on the island, constituted the basic causes for the Cypriots’ uprising in October 1931 (Octobriana). During the uprising, protesters burned down the Government-house and the English responded with shootings. The first victim of the shootings was Onoufrios Clerides, aged 17, from Agios Theodoros of Agros. Clerides originated from the village, and especially from the family of Nearchos Clerides.

World War II
The participation of Agros in World War II was massive. Among the people of Agros who participated were Glafkos Clerides, former president of the Republic of Cyprus, and Andreas N. Tzionis. The former served as a flight-sergeant in the British Air-force, whereas the latter in the U.S. Army. Moreover, as Hadjipetris remarks, “the father of the former President Mr Ioannis Clerides, his brother Xanthos, as well as the children of Nearchos Clerides, Lefkos and Phoebos Clerides also fought in World War II”.

K. Leonidas was killed in battle, and Varnavas Savva and Stelios Kalli were seriously wounded. The grave of K. Leonidas is located in Tobruk of Libya.

EOKA fight

The action of Agros in the liberating fight of EOKA against the British colonisers was extremely important. From the beginning of the fight, Agros was the command centre of the Pitsilia region. Gregoris Afxentiou guided the guerrilla fighters of the entire Troödos area from Agros. The people of Agros who participated in the EOKA fight were more than a hundred. In this text it is impossible to even mention them all. Cited in brief below are some reports from Hadjipetris about the contribution of the people of Agros in the fight.

The first sector-head for Pitsilia, Renos Kyriakides, visits Agros in 1955 and in particular the home of the head of Agros, Diomedes Mavroyiannis. A few days later, they establish the Youth of EOKA called ANE, in Apeiteio Gymnasium. ANE developed significant activity to a degree that, as Renos Kyriakides remarks, “the English began to deal with the activity of ANE of Agros instead of hunting down guerrilla fighters”.
The first student protest of the Apeiteio Gymnasium took place on April 30, 1955, after the arrest of their fellow student Costas Pissarides. For this daring action of them, the students were charged by the British for “having paraded in Agros without a written permit by the Commander of Lemesos”.
In several residences of Agros there were many guerrilla hideouts. The first guerrilla hideout was in the home of Kyriacou Polykarpou. Stylianos Lenas would manufacture grenades there. When the hideout was compromised, Lenas continued to manufacture grenades in a hideout in another village. As we have already said, the headquarters of Agros was also in a hideout in Agros.

The first ever curfew in Cyprus was imposed in Agros on August 17, 1955.

On June 14, 1956, the son of our community, Petros Eliades, is seriously wounded by an English soldier's fire gun the moment he was ready to throw a bomb. This brave man of Agros died on the following day.  More: Heroes Monument

Also important was the contribution of Andreas Vasileiou, who, before he became a guerrilla fighter, had caused a serious strike to the British Air-force. In particular, on November 26, 1957, he placed bombs and destroyed four Canberra bomber aircraft and a Venom pursuit plane. This sabotage is considered to have been the biggest one of the liberating fight.

There were many guerrilla fighters from Agros, some of which were sentenced to prison and others were kept as political prisoners without a trial.

During the entire fight, the people of Agros had an enormous contribution to it. Hadjipetris writes: “The participation of the people in the passive resistance and the operation of an arbitration court, whose president in Agros was Papairacles Tsaggarides, had a remarkable success”.

The last curfew was imposed in Agros and Agridia on January 22, 1959, when the women of these two communities threw stones against English soldiers. The contribution of women to the Liberating Fight against the colonization is honoured with the construction of the Cypriot Woman Fighter's monument, which is a devout offer to the memory and honour to the woman fighter of the 1955 generation in the region of Pitsilia.

The expatriate people of Agros also contributed to the fight from the cities where they lived in (from Nicosia, Lemesos or elsewhere).

Intercommunal fights of 1963
A group of men from Agros participated in the intercommunal fights of 1963. These were: Panayiotis Gerasiotis, Petros Sofroniou, Stavros Mathaiou, Leandros Tsolakis and Andreas Pissarides.

Turkish invasion of 1974
In a speech of his, Renos Kyriakides writes according to Hadjipetris: “It was not possible for this village not to stand worthy of the circumstances of the time. Five young men of Agros sacrificed their lives in the fight against the Turkish invaders”. These were: Christophoros Pissarides, Antonakis Tsolakis, Yiannakis A. Mavrou, Nicos Hadjipavlou, and Antonakis Adamou Agrotis.

Climate

Agrotourism

Local tourists were attracted to Agros from the early stages of Cyprus agrotourism inception.

Accommodation can be found at traditionally built hotels, as well as at many bed and breakfast rooms in traditional homes.

The village maintains its traditional character and offers a natural and built with significant historical, religious and cultural sites.

Local visitor attractions include the views of the mountain, walking in the village narrow streets, natural trails, the traditional local food and wine served at traditional taverns and the produce of the village promoted by the in-house shops of the local enterprises.

Rose bushes cultivation

Agros roses bush - of the species Rosa damascena – owe its proliferation to the late Nearchos Klirides who in 1917 as a school teacher in his native village of Agros founded the Pupils Association for the Dissemination of the Rose Bush and introduced an incentive scheme targeting the expansion of the cultivation of the rose bush with the aim of producing rose water. According to Klirides vision, this would contribute to a substantial improvement of the standard of living of the local community.

In May, visitor-volunteers participate for the gathering of the roses.

Heroes and monuments

The village of Agros has built a monument near “Apeitios High School” to honor the hero Petros Iliadis. The monument is a copper bust based on a marble base.

Petros Iliadis was born in Agros in 1932. He went to the elementary school of the village and continued his studies in Apeitios high school, where now lies his monument.

His parents, Ilias Louka and Panayiota Ilia created a big family and gave to their children strict values for life. Petros had five siblings: Andreas, Foinikou, Cleopatra, Ellada and Eleftheria.

When Petros finished school, he left for the capital where he worked as a grocer. He was also a member of a Christian Union (OXEN).

Some years later he became a member of EOKA which was a team fighting against the British. He was in the same team with Iakovos Patatsos and Panayiotis Georgiadis, two other great heroes.

He was responsible for the recruitment of the team as well as to hide and transport secret weapons and mail.

He was a strong person both in body and soul, so he decided to recruit the assault team of Nicosia which was in real need of fighters.

On 14 June 1956 he participated in a bomb attack against the British. The attack took place in the main post office. Petros tried to approach the building but an English guard saw him and shot him. He managed to walk for some meters and the other members of his team took him to the hospital. The doctors gave their best but it was too late. The bullet went through his right lung and his stomach. He died the next morning, on 15 June, and was buried in Agros some days later.

Churches

Church of Panagia Eleousa

The so-called «Agios Theofanis en to megalo Agro» (Saint Theofanis in the Great Agros) was firm fighter of the Byzantine Iconoclasm and prior of what was then the Monastery of “Panagia Eleousa” (Blessed Virgin Mary the Merciful). He came from  Asia Minor, where during Iconoclasm he was condemned and driven away. He was exiled to Samothraki in 817 AD where he died. From 817 until 842 (the era of Iconoclasm) this firm supporter faithfully performed his duties. The prior was condemned because he rejected the Imperial Decrees, which turned against the icons. The monks living with him in the same monastery (preserving the same name that was dedicated to “Panagia Eleousa”) in Asia Minor, decided to come to Cyprus after his death. Having come to Cyprus, they resided in a cave in the region of the village Agros for some period. It is not known for how long they stayed in the cave. In 817 they also brought the icon of “Panagia Eleousa” to the monastery in the Agros village. The monastery, being packed with monks, was in operating regularly. Later on, between the 16th and 17th century, a large-scale epidemic of the deadly disease cholera struck the area. In order to protect themselves from the epidemic, all the inhabitants moved and constructed their houses right outside the monastery, under the wing of the Virgin Mary. Thus the village of Agros was created. The monastery properly functioned until 1830. Afterwards, the monastery no longer hosting any monks, the Metropolitan Diocese started to let out the monastery's cells. To some degree they were exploiting the monastery. This tactic continued until 1880. We ought to mention that during the Turkish domination people granted their estates to the monastery so as to avoid the taxes that were enforced on them. However, the inhabitants rose up and started having claims themselves. One of them had suggested that if the monastery got demolished then the Diocese would no longer preserve its rights. And so it was done. In 1894 they demolished the monastery. When the Metropolitan Bishop went to perform a liturgy in the monastery he found himself facing it demolished in astonishment. This was not accepted by the Metropolitan Diocese and as a result they imposed a fine on the inhabitants.

In that same year and right on the same spot, the inhabitants started building today's church, which still exists now at the center of the Agros village, at their own initiative. The operations ended in 1909. It is a cross-like structure with a dome. It is quite a big church that can accommodate up to 1500 of the faithful. Externally it is made of local stone. The Church is 97 feet long and 48 feet wide. The dome's height is 49 feet and the surrounding wall is  feet thick. The steeple is a real sight, tall and adjacent to the church's north-east corner, bearing three large bells. Internally it is whitewashed but with no hagiographies. The High Altar remains the same, having been saved during the demolition of the monastery. The icon screen it the church's special treasure. It is woodcut. It bears carefully made, beautiful icons of the saints that were made by the renowned hagiographer Solonas Fragkoulis from 1930 until 1934. Inside it is flat and quite spacious, a women's loft having been added. The women's loft was constructed later on in 1955. The icon dedicated to the Virgin Mary is still in existence and it is quite old (1856). This icon was covered by a silver, painted cover. This was kept until 1987 when the unveiling of the holy icon was performed. This icon has been preserved and today it can be found in the nearby little church, which was constructed in 1990 so as to remind the existence of the “Monastery of Great Agros” in this area. Along with this old icon, there are some other extant items from the monastery such as a piece of the icon screen and the icon of Christ. It celebrates on the 21st of November, the day of the Virgin Mary's Presentation to the Temple. A large fair takes place and many are the faithful that come to kneel before Her holy icon.

The Church of Timios Prodromos

East of the village, in the midst of the traditional houses, the church of Timios Prodromos (John the Baptist) was constructed around 1860. It is due to the initiative and the contributions of the inhabitants that it was made. It is of the basilica style with tiles on the roof. It is 100 feet long and 25 feet wide. It is unique throughout Cyprus with regards to its length. The church's inauguration was done in 1892.

In 1984 the roof had to be replaced since the passage of many years and the plentiful water of rain that gradually penetrated had caused serious damages, thus deeming its replacement necessary. Externally a low-rise wall that is coated with local stone surrounds it. The yard is comfortable and also covered with local stone. Two note-worthy fountains, coated with stone, were constructed in 1990. One is in the east of the yard and the other in its west.

Inside there are some hagiographies such as that of “Panagia Platytera” over the chancel. The rich in chasings, wooden icon screen was made in 1914. The two gates, the “Oraia Pyli” (“the Beautiful Gate”, central) and the north gate (to the right), are formed in the icon screen. Inside it is flat. In 1960 they paved a new floor, the former one with the old slates no longer being able to sustain trampling by the believers. The dedicated icon dates back to 1887 and it is found on the icon screen right next to the holy icon of Christ. It celebrates with a fair on the 29th of August, the holy icon of the Saint being carried about in procession.

Frangoulides Museum

One of the most important museums of the island is the “Museum Fragoulides” and it is built near the church of Panagia in the village Agros. The museum was founded in 2004 to honor Solomos Fragoulides (1902-1981), who was one of the greater representatives of the first generation of Cypriot artists. He is also considered a pioneer painter and hagiographer.

The love between the painter and the inhabitants of the village was mutual and it grew during the stay of Fragoulides in Agros from 1932 to 1934. The painter writes in his biography: "Concerning my painting, the two years I have spent in Agros, were the happiest of my entire life. I felt loved by the people here...". The village returned this love by building the museum in his memory.

His work has both an artistic and religious value. He was the hagiographer who undertook the painting of all the portable icons of the church of Panagia.

The idea for the foundation of the museum belongs to Solon Papachristodoulou who was actually the god child of the painter as well as his only heir. He inherited all his fortune, reports, patterns, unfinished paintings, paintings, several materials and accessories for painting but also his rich record. Fragoulides explains in his biography how he met Solon. He says that a young couple asked him to become the best man at their wedding and then christen their child. And he did so. He also decided to name the baby after his own name, Solon.

Solonas in corporation with the Association of Farmers and Friends of Agros, the members of the Executive Council and the help of the entire village organized the museum. The building was donated by the church.

Traditional arts/occupation

The rose water

In the village of Agros, there are roses that the locals use them to produce rose water. The wide spread of these roses was made by Nearchos Kliridis who brought to the village the first still, which is necessary for the production of rose water. The traditional way of rose water production requires the use of a still which is composed of a cauldron and a barrel. The barrel must be full of water. The roses are placed in the cauldron with plenty of water. For every kg of roses, about  kg of water must be added. In the meanwhile, the fire is turned on and the mixture in the cauldron is simmering. The steam which is created is going through a copper pipe into the barrel. In the barrel, the steam is liquefied and become rose water with incredible scent. For each kg of roses which is used in this procedure,  of rose water is finally produced.

Traditional sweets

The area is also popular for its traditional sweets. The most common are the sweets with syrup. There are around 40 to 50 kinds of sweets in syrup, such as the walnut, the cherry, the water melon, the grape, the quince and the rose. The inhabitants of Agros claim that the sweet made of rose is very good for health as it can cure several illnesses. The majority of the visitors prefer the sweet made of walnuts. The manufacture of these sweets lasts two days. They are put in syrup which is made of water and sugar.

In the village, one can find some more traditional Cypriot desserts, like mahallebi and loukoumades. The former one, is usually prepared during summer and it is served cold. The latter is a deep fried dough, soaked in syrup. While these pastry products can be found in many places in Cyprus, the traditional Agros recipe demands to be flavored with local rosewater.

Meat products

The meat products which are produced in Agros are very special and known for their taste and scent. They are usually salted or smoked and they are produced with the traditional Cypriot recipes. Some of these products are the "chiromeri", the "lountza", and the "bacon". These three products are made of pork meat, wine and salt. The entire procedure lasts 3 months. In the lountza and bacon a special spice is added, the coriander which offers a lovely scent. The preparation of these two meat products lasts two weeks.

Another popular and traditional product of Agros are the sausages. They are made of mince pork meat, wine, salt, coriander and other spices. Pastourmas is a kind of sausage which is prepared in Agros and it is also very popular. It is made of beef, a variety of spices, garlic and salt. Undoubtedly, the small industries of meat products in Agros have managed to rescue the traditional recipes of pork products with great success.

2005 Helvetia Cup 
The 2005 Helvetia Cup or 2005 European B Team Championships in badminton was held from January 19 to January 23 in Agros, Cyprus. The 23rd Balkan Mathematical Olympiad was held in Agros, Cyprus from 27 April to 3 May 2006.

International relations

Twin towns – sister cities
Agros is a member of the Douzelage, a unique town twinning association of 28 towns across the European Union. This active town twinning began in 1991 and there are regular events, such as a produce market from each of the other countries and festivals.

 Altea, Spain - 1991
 Bad Kötzting, Germany - 1991
 Bellagio, Italy - 1991
 Bundoran, Ireland - 1991
 Granville, France - 1991
 Holstebro, Denmark - 1991
 Houffalize, Belgium - 1991
 Meerssen, the Netherlands - 1991
 Niederanven, Luxembourg - 1991
 Preveza, Greece - 1991
 Sesimbra, Portugal - 1991
 Sherborne, United Kingdom - 1991
 Oxelösund, Sweden - 1998
 Judenburg, Austria - 1999
 Chojna, Poland - 2004
 Kőszeg, Hungary - 2004
 Sigulda, Latvia - 2004
 Sušice, Czech Republic - 2004
 Türi, Estonia - 2004
 Zvolen, Slovakia - 2007
 Prienai, Lithuania - 2008
 Marsaskala, Malta - 2009
 Siret, Romania - 2010
 Škofja Loka, Slovenia - 2011
 Tryavna, Bulgaria - 2011
 Asikkala, Finland - 
 Rovinj, Croatia -

Gallery

References

External links

Websites
 Official website of Agros village and tourist information (in Greek and English).
 Agros Information from a local website.
 Cypruslikethis
 Facebook Group
 Twitter Account 
 Awarded "EDEN - European Destinations of Excellence" non traditional tourist destination 2008
 More information of Agros in Greek

Industries and Local Business Websites
 The Rose Factory
 Nikis Sweets
 Helleniana Cultural Center

Places to stay
 Rodon Hotel
 Agrospito
 To spiti tou pramatefti

Videos
 Video of Agros
 Agros Mineral Water Commercial
 Video of Agros
 A short video showing the beauty of Agros

Slideshows
 A small presentation of Agros

Communities in Limassol District